Paul Lange may refer to:

 Paul Lange (musician) (1857–1919), German musician
 Paul Lange (canoeist) (1931–2016), German sprint canoer
 Paul Lange, co-founder of Lobotomy Software
 Paul de Lange (born 1981), Dutch footballer

See also
 Paul van Lange (born 1961), Dutch psychologist